Jean Amable Amédée Pastelot (1820, Moulins – 1870, Paris) was a 19th-century French painter and caricaturist.

Luigi Loir (1845–1916) worked for him from 1863.

External links 
 Jean Amable Amédée Pastelot on data.bnf.fr
 Notice on Musée d'Orsay
 Some paintings on Artnet

19th-century French painters
French caricaturists
1820 births
Artists from Moulins, Allier
1870 deaths